Stigmella palionisi is a moth of the family Nepticulidae. It is known from the Russian Far East.

The larvae probably feed on Ulmus species.

External links
Nepticulidae and Opostegidae of the world

Nepticulidae
Moths of Asia
Moths described in 1984